Sonata No. 6 in E-flat major WXI/3 is a sonata written for keyboard by Johann Christoph Friedrich Bach.

Structure

The piece starts off with a motif, which is in the score image, that then repeats with a slight variation at the end. There is then a short section involving a sequence and many typical baroque trills. There is then a section where the left hand plays a sequence, followed by a right hand playing three semiquavers. After several of these, there is a new motif. This then ends in some syncopation and finally, the piece repeats its original tune.

Further on, there is a modulation to A flat major, where the main theme is repeated. The piece ends with the last three-quarters of the original motif, its repeat and a modulation back to the original key of E flat major.

Culture

This piece is currently on the 2009-2010, Grade 7 Piano syllabus of the Associated Board of the Royal Schools of Music

References

Bach, JCF
Compositions in E-flat major
Compositions by Johann Christoph Friedrich Bach